Charles Mathew Gray (1853 – 11 June 1918) was a New Zealand Independent Member of Parliament for Christchurch North, and Mayor of Christchurch.

Early life
Charles Gray was born in Geelong, Victoria, in Australia and came to New Zealand in 1862.

Local body politics

Gray was elected to the Christchurch City Council in 1885. Mayoral elections were held on 26 November 1890. The two candidates were the incumbent, Samuel Manning, and Gray, who received 492 and 665 votes, respectively. Gray was thus elected as the 17th mayor of Christchurch and was installed on 17 December 1890. He was mayor until the end of 1891. On 18 April 1904, he succeeded Henry Wigram as mayor, when he was declared elected unopposed. He served for one year, and his chief aims were beautifying the city, drainage, sanitation, lighting and high pressure water supply.

Member of Parliament

Charles Gray represented the Christchurch North electorate in the New Zealand House of Representatives from the 1905 election to 1908.

Gray defeated Tommy Taylor in the 1905 contest for Christchurch North.

Gray made it clear during the election campaign that he was an independent Liberal who would go to the House unfettered by party obligations. He declared that he was not a 'party man'.

Death

Gray died in Christchurch on 11 June 1918.

References

Further reading

|-

Independent MPs of New Zealand
Mayors of Christchurch
People of the New Zealand Wars
New Zealand businesspeople
New Zealand businesspeople in retailing
Australian emigrants to New Zealand
Politicians from Geelong
1853 births
1918 deaths
New Zealand MPs for Christchurch electorates
Burials at Linwood Cemetery, Christchurch
Christchurch City Councillors
Unsuccessful candidates in the 1908 New Zealand general election
Members of the New Zealand House of Representatives